Włodzimierz Kiniorski, also known as Kinior, (born 15 July 1952) is Polish musician.  He was a member of Brygada Kryzys.

Discography 
 Undergrajdoł (1987)
 Cosmopolis (1992)
 Darmozjad (1997)
 Goral-Ska Apo-Calypso (2000)
 Ethno Techno (2004)
 Odmieniec (2006)
 Live In Bohema Jazz Club (2007)
 Juhaskie Bazynio (2007)
 Ludovizja (2008)
 Myriam (2009)
 Bee (2010)
 Intarsja (2010)
 Dwugłowy smok. Festiwal Wolność i Pokój (2014)

External links 
 Official website
 Włodzimierz Kiniorski in Discogs.com
 Włodek Kiniorski: Całe nasze pokolenie pakowało, Kasia Bednarczykówna, Jakub Wątor 07.04.2012 Gazeta Wyborcza

1952 births
Polish musicians
Living people